The Arctic Waters Pollution Prevention Act (1970, R.S.C. 1985) (the Act) is a Government of Canada statute to prevent pollution of areas of the arctic waters adjacent to the mainland and islands of the Canadian arctic. The Government of Canada departments responsible for enforcing the Act are Natural Resources Canada, Transport Canada, Indian and Northern Affairs Canada.

References

1965 in the environment
Environmental law in Canada
Crown-Indigenous Relations and Northern Development Canada
Natural Resources Canada
Transport Canada
1965 in Canadian law
Canadian federal legislation